Brayan José de la Torre Martínez  (born January 11, 1991) is an Ecuadorian football midfielder currently playing for L.D.U. Portoviejo in the Ecuadorian Serie A.

Club career

Barcelona SC

2009-2011
De la Torre rose in the youth ranks of Barcelona and is considered a future prospect. In 2009, De la Trorre had the opportunity to play a match with head coach  Benito Floro.  In 2010 season, he had the opportunity to play in 6 matches, scoring his first  goal in the senior team on a  3–0 home victory against Independiente José Terán. De la Torre has been a regular starter since the 2010 season along with others Barcelona's future prospect like Dennys Quiñónez and Christian Cruz. In the 2011 season, De la Torre's career took a huge step, with the support of then Argentine coach Ruben Dario Insua, gave him more continuity as a starter in the senior team. On April 2,  Álex Aguinaga was debuting as the new head coach of Barcelona, he made Brayan played 90 minutes and he scored the winning goal against Independiente José Terán in Sangolquí.

2012 Season
On November 28, De La Torre became 2012 Serie A champion with Barcelona SC, after nearly 14 years since Barcelona have won their last league title.

International career
De la Torre is a member of the Ecuador Under-20 national team. On February 12, 2011, the Ecuador Under-20 
qualify to the 2011 FIFA U-20 World Cup. On September 6, 2011, De La Torre debuted on the Ecuador national team as a substitute against Costa Rica. Ecuador won the game 4–0.

Honors

Club
Barcelona SC
Serie A (1): 2012

References

External links

1991 births
Living people
Sportspeople from Guayaquil
Association football midfielders
Ecuadorian footballers
Ecuadorian expatriate footballers
Ecuadorian Serie A players
Ecuadorian Serie B players
Ascenso MX players
Barcelona S.C. footballers
Dorados de Sinaloa footballers
Guayaquil City F.C. footballers
C.D. Técnico Universitario footballers
Fuerza Amarilla S.C. footballers
L.D.U. Portoviejo footballers
Ecuadorian expatriate sportspeople in Mexico
Expatriate footballers in Mexico